C M. Vitankar was an illustrator who created several covers for the popular Indian comic book series Amar Chitra Katha, as well another lesser-known series Manoj Chitra Katha. He also worked in the Hindi film industry in Mumbai as a poster artist, according to Nandini Chandra, author of The Classic Popular: Amar Chitra Katha, 1967-2007. He did the artworks for different Amar Chitra Katha comics like 'Ganesha' , 'Tales of Shiva' , 'Arjuna', 'the Monkey and the Boy'  and 'Karttikeya' edited and published by Anant Pai

References

External links
C. M. Vitankar page at WorldCat

Indian comics artists